Houda Benyamina (born 1980) is a French director and screenwriter. She won the Cannes Film Festival Camera d'Or and César Award for Best First Feature Film for her 2016 film Divines.

Benyamina was born in Viry-Châtillon, Paris in a Moroccan family. Her family includes younger sister Oulaya Amamra.

In 2013, Benyamina directed the short film On the Road to Paradise. For Divines, Benyamina won the Camera d'Or, and Best First Film at the 42nd César Awards on 24 February, where she was also nominated for Best Director and shared a nomination for Best Original Screenplay.

Filmography

Awards & Nominations

References

External links

1980 births
César Award winners
Film directors from Paris
French women film directors
French women screenwriters
French screenwriters
Living people
French people of Moroccan descent
Directors of Caméra d'Or winners